The Republic of Uzbekistan has an embassy in Ashgabat. Turkmenistan has an embassy in Tashkent. Both countries were previously subordinated republics of the Soviet Union as Turkmen Soviet Socialist Republic and Uzbek Soviet Socialist Republic before its collapse in 1991.

History 
The Embassy of Turkmenistan in Tashkent was opened in 1996. The Embassy of Uzbekistan in Ashgabat was opened in 1995.

Rifts 
Relations between Turkmenistan and Uzbekistan became very tense in the 1990s, in which a major source of tension was ethnic conflict and border controls. In the former, the Turkmen minority of Uzbekistan and the Uzbek minority of Turkmenistan have been subjected to state sponsored discriminations, while many have a lack of fluency in the other nation's language as well as Russian, which are the languages of higher education.

Relations in late 2002 

Ties worsened particularly under the government of Turkmen President Saparmurat Niyazov, who in November 2002 accused Uzbekistan of being responsible for sponsoring an attempt on his life. He accused Uzbekistan's ambassador in Ashgabat, Abdurashid Kadyrov, of assisting an alleged coup leader, former Foreign minister Boris Şyhmyradow. As a result, the Uzbek ambassador was forced to leave and in the following days, Turkmen authorities forcibly relocated ethnic Uzbeks living near the Turkmen border. The peak in this tension arose when a month later, when the special forces of the Ministry for National Security of Turkmenistan raided the Embassy of Uzbekistan in Ashgabat on 16 December to look for Şyhmyradow. The raid violated the Vienna Convention on the Immunity of Diplomatic Missions and Diplomats. The Turkmen authorities justified the raid by saying that they were trying to “search for terrorists hiding in the embassy”. During the invasion of the embassy, the Ambassador Kadyrov and his wife were at the Kazakh Embassy, at a gala reception in honor of the Independence Day of Kazakhstan. As a result, Uzbek President Islam Karimov on principle refused to personally participate in the funeral of Niyazov several years later.

Border 

Turkmenistan and Uzbekistan had serious "issues" regarding their mutual border until May 2004 when the Turkmen Foreign Ministry released a statement on May 31, 2004 saying disputes had been resolved. Relations on this issue have further improved In recent years, with work to achieve the full demarcation of the border have been ongoing.

Positive developments 
The state visit of President Karimov to Turkmenistan in October 2007 and the state visit of the new Turkmen President Gurbanguly Berdimuhamedov to Uzbekistan in March 2008 became important stages in the positive development of Turkmen-Uzbek relations. Subsequent meetings (particularly their meeting in 2012) between Berdimuhamedov and Karimov contributed to the development of relations. Until Shavkat Mirziyoev became Uzbekistan's president in September 2016, Turkmenistan was considered to be the only Central Asian neighbor which it had good bilateral relations.

Ambassadors 
Ambassadors from Turkmenistan to Uzbekistan:

 Soltan Pirmukhammedov (1996-2012)
 Shiri Shiriev (2012-2018)
 Yazkuli Mamedov (2018–present)

Ambassadors from Uzbekistan to Turkmenistan:

 Abdulakhat Jalilov (1995-1999)
 Abdurashid Kadyrov (1999-2002)
 Alisher Kadyrov (2005-2009)
 Sherzod Fayziev (2009-2012)
 Javkhar Izamov (2012-2016)
 Akmalzhon Kuchkarov (2016–present)

See also 
 Foreign relations of Uzbekistan
 Foreign relations of Turkmenistan

References

 
Bilateral relations of Uzbekistan
Uzbekistan